"Born to Lead" is the third single from rock band Hoobastank's third studio album Every Man for Himself. It performed moderately well on the rock charts.

The song and its music video were used as a skin for the game Lumines II. The background voice as the drill instructor is retired U.S. Marine Corps officer Dale Dye.

This is the last music video to feature bassist Josh Moreau, who left the band in early 2008.

Track listing
US Radio Promo
"Born to Lead" - 3:48

Charts

References 

Hoobastank songs
2006 singles
2006 songs
Island Records singles
Songs written by Dan Estrin
Songs written by Doug Robb
Songs written by Chris Hesse